The 2019–20 Utah Valley Wolverines men's basketball team represented Utah Valley University in the 2019–20 NCAA Division I men's basketball season. The Wolverines, led by first-year head coach Mark Madsen, played their home games at the UCCU Center in Orem, Utah as members of the Western Athletic Conference. They finished the season 11–19, 5–10 in WAC play to finish in finish in eighth place. Due to irregularities in the WAC standings due to cancelled games, they were set to be the No. 6 seed in the WAC tournament, however, the tournament was cancelled amid the COVID-19 pandemic.

Previous season
The Wolverines finished the 2018–19 season with an overall record of 25–10, including 12–4 in WAC play, to finish in second place. In the 2019 WAC tournament, they defeated UMKC in the quarterfinals before losing to Grand Canyon in the semifinals the following day. On March 17, they accepted a bid to play in the 2019 College Basketball Invitational. They defeated Cal State Northridge in the first round before losing in the quarterfinals to South Florida.

This was Mark Pope's final season as head coach of Utah Valley; he replaced the retiring Dave Rose as head coach of the BYU men's basketball team.

Roster

Schedule and results 

|-
!colspan=9 style=| Exhibition

|-
!colspan=9 style=| Non-conference regular season

|-
!colspan=9 style=| WAC regular season

|- style="background:#bbbbbb"
| style="text-align:center"|Mar 7, 20202:00 pm, WAC DN
|
| Chicago State
| colspan=2 rowspan=1 style="text-align:center"|Cancelled due to the COVID-19 pandemic
| style="text-align:center"|UCCU CenterOrem UT
|-
!colspan=9 style=""| WAC tournament
|-
|- style="background:#bbbbbb"
| style="text-align:center"|Mar 12, 20209:30 pm, ESPN+
| style="text-align:center"| (6)
| vs. (3) SeattleQuarterfinals
| colspan=2 rowspan=1 style="text-align:center"|Cancelled due to the COVID-19 pandemic
| style="text-align:center"|Orleans ArenaParadise, NV
|-

Source:

References

Utah Valley Wolverines men's basketball seasons
Utah Valley